Mesía is a municipality in the northwestern Spanish province of A Coruña. It has a population of 2,922 (Spanish 2011 Census) and an area of 107 km².

Civil parishes

Municipalities in the Province of A Coruña